Nyctemera clarior is a moth of the family Erebidae first described by Walter Karl Johann Roepke in 1957. It is found on Sumatra and Malacca.

References

Nyctemerina
Moths described in 1957